Paglaum Party may refer to:

Bukidnon Paglaum
Paglaum Party (Negros Occidental)